Morumbi is a train station on ViaMobilidade Line 9-Emerald, located in the limits of district of Santo Amaro. It will be connected to ViaMobilidade Line 17-Gold, scheduled to 2nd semester of 2022.

History
Morumbi station was built and opened by Estrada de Ferro Sorocabana (along with Jurubatuba branch), on January 25, 1957, and demolished in the 1970s by FEPASA during the remodeling of commuter trains. Because of the lack of funds, its reconstruction project was paralyzed during all the 1980s, being reestablished only in 1994, when the architectural project was hired from architect Luiz Carlos Esteves. In 1992, CPTM launched the project South Dinamization, which wanted to conclude the construction of the remaining stations of the line.

Toponymy
The word "Morumbi" is an indigenous term of Tupi origin that can mean "green fly" (moru: fly, and mbi: green). The ethnologist Eduardo Navarro defends that "Morumbi" has other meanings, as from the tupi maromby, which meaning is "river of the big fishes" (maromba: "big fish"; y: "river"), or marumbi, term of Portuguese language that means "lagoon full of taboas".

References

Railway stations opened in 1957